Ruth Monteiro is an Bissau-Guinean lawyer. She was the Minister of Justice and Human Rights.

Education 
Ruth Monteiro has a degree in Law from the Faculty of Law of the University of Lisbon, awarded in 1985.

References 

Living people
21st-century women politicians
Government ministers of Guinea-Bissau
Women government ministers of Guinea-Bissau
Justice ministers
Bissau-Guinean lawyers
University of Lisbon alumni
Year of birth missing (living people)